Joseph Anthony Philbin (born July 2, 1961) is an American football coach who, until recently, served as the offensive line coach for the Dallas Cowboys of the National Football League. He was the head coach of the Miami Dolphins, a position he held from 2012 to 2015. Philbin was also the offensive coordinator of the Green Bay Packers from 2007 to 2011, helping them win Super Bowl XLV over the Pittsburgh Steelers. Most recently, Philbin served as interim head coach of the Packers for the final four games of the 2018 season after serving as the offensive coordinator for the first part of the season.

Early life
Philbin was born in Springfield, Massachusetts to Paul and Mary Philbin. He attended Longmeadow High School and did a postgraduate year at Worcester Academy. He graduated from Washington & Jefferson College in 1984, where he obtained a B.A. in sociology and played one year on the football team. He was a member of the Lambda Chi Alpha fraternity. He pursued a Master of Education in administration and supervision from Tulane University in 1986.

Coaching career

College
From 1984 to 2002, Philbin coached at the collegiate level. As the offensive coordinator, he helped win an NCAA Division III Football Championship with Allegheny College in 1990. In 1998, he was offered the position of head football coach at his alma mater, Washington & Jefferson, but turned down the position to coach at Iowa. He served under Kirk Ferentz at Iowa from 1999–2002.

Green Bay Packers
In 2003, Philbin joined the Green Bay Packers coaching staff. He spent nine years in Green Bay. During his tenure as offensive coordinator (2007–2011), the Packers offense ranked in the top 10 in the NFL for points scored and total yards every year, including their 2010 Super Bowl-winning season.

Miami Dolphins
In January 2012, Philbin was named the tenth head coach of the Miami Dolphins, beating out interim coach Todd Bowles and Denver Broncos offensive coordinator Mike McCoy, who were the other two finalists for the job. Philbin praised the Dolphins as a team with a "strong nucleus to build around," and the "passion" of the fans, players and management. Dolphins owner Stephen M. Ross stated that Philbin has all of the attributes that he was looking for in a head coach.  Philbin guided the team to a 24–28 record during his time as the Dolphins head coach, unable to lead it to a winning record or make the playoffs. Through his first three seasons, the offense improved from a ranking of 27 to 11, but the defense slid from 7th to 20th. Philbin was fired by the Dolphins after a 1–3 start to the 2015 season. Reaction about the end of Philbin's tenure was met favorably by most fans and media alike. Tight ends coach Dan Campbell replaced Philbin as the team's interim head coach.

Indianapolis Colts
Philbin was hired by the Colts as offensive line and assistant head coach ahead of the 2016 season. He replaced Hal Hunter, who was let go following the 2015 campaign.

Return to Packers
On January 10, 2018, Philbin was hired by the Green Bay Packers to once again serve as offensive coordinator, which he previously did from 2007 until 2011 when he was hired as the Dolphins head coach.

On December 2, 2018, after a 17–20 Packers home loss to the 2–9 Arizona Cardinals (their first home loss to the Cardinals in 69 years), Philbin was named interim head coach of the Packers, after Mike McCarthy was fired. He was not retained under new head coach Matt LaFleur.

Dallas Cowboys
On January 9, 2020, Philbin was hired by the Dallas Cowboys as their new offensive line coach. The move reunited Philbin with new Cowboys head coach Mike McCarthy, whom Philbin served as an assistant to with the Green Bay Packers from 2006 to 2011 and again in 2018 before McCarthy's firing.

Philbin was among five Cowboys coaches let go at the conclusion of the 2022 season.

Head coaching record

* – Interim head coach

Personal life
Philbin is married to Diane Marie Philbin (née Donahue). Their son, Michael, was reported missing on January 8, 2012.  The following evening, a body pulled from the Fox River in Oshkosh was confirmed to be 21-year-old Michael Philbin. Toxicology results later showed that Michael had been under the influence of alcohol at the time of his death.

In 2014 in Florida, Philbin's son Matthew crashed his vehicle into another car and fled the scene of the accident.

Matthew is currently a Section 8 landlord in San Diego.

References

External links
 Green Bay Packers profile
 Miam Dolphins profile

1961 births
Living people
Allegheny Gators football coaches
Dallas Cowboys coaches
Green Bay Packers coaches
Harvard Crimson football coaches
Indianapolis Colts coaches
Iowa Hawkeyes football coaches
Merchant Marine Mariners football coaches
Miami Dolphins head coaches
National Football League offensive coordinators
Northeastern Huskies football coaches
Ohio Bobcats football coaches
Tulane Green Wave football coaches
Washington & Jefferson Presidents football players
WPI Engineers football coaches
Sportspeople from Springfield, Massachusetts
Coaches of American football from Massachusetts
Players of American football from Massachusetts
Green Bay Packers head coaches